The Sandringham Sandstone is a geologic formation in England. It preserves fossils dating back to the Cretaceous period.

See also

 List of fossiliferous stratigraphic units in England

References
 

Cretaceous England
Sandstone formations